Juan Sebastián Agudelo  (born November 23, 1992) is an American professional soccer player who plays as a striker for USL Championship club Birmingham Legion.

After moving from Colombia to New Jersey at an early age Agudelo began his career with the New York Red Bulls and made his Major League Soccer debut in October 2010. After scoring six goals in 2011 he was traded to Chivas USA in May 2012. Agudelo spent a year in California before he was traded to the New England Revolution in May 2013. He joined English side Stoke City in January 2014 but a failure to gain a UK work permit saw him loaned out to Dutch side FC Utrecht.

Internationally, Agudelo has represented the United States youth program at the Under-17, Under-20, and Under-23 levels. He made his debut for the senior national team against South Africa on November 17, 2010, scoring the only goal of the match.

Early life
Agudelo moved with his family from Colombia to the New York area at the age of seven. He grew up and played soccer in Barnegat Township, New Jersey, before moving to Kinnelon, New Jersey to live with his godmother. He attended St. Benedict's Preparatory School for one year, in 2007.

Club career

New York Red Bulls
Agudelo began his career with the New York Red Bull Academy a member of the U.S. Soccer Development Academy and quickly established himself as one of the more skilled prospects at the club. In 2009, he was offered a chance to join the junior team but decided to accept a trial with Colombian side Millonarios in 2010. Although it was reported that he had signed with Millonarios, he returned to the United States to join Red Bulls during their pre-season. While with Millonarios, Agudelo played with the youth side, including a match against Independiente Santa Fe on January 17, which served as a tribute match to Brazilian great Pelé.

On March 26, 2010, Agudelo officially joined the New York Red Bulls. He made his professional debut on April 27, 2010, in a U.S. Open Cup game against Philadelphia Union. Agudelo made his MLS debut against Real Salt Lake October 9, 2010, entering in the 85th minute in a match that ended in a scoreless draw. He scored his first professional goal on March 19, 2011, in the Red Bulls' 2011 MLS season opener, a 1–0 victory over Seattle Sounders FC.

As directed by US National team manager Jürgen Klinsmann, that all off-season US MLS stars should train with European clubs, on November 16, 2011, Agudelo started a two-week training period with VfB Stuttgart. On December 1, 2011, Agudelo started a similar two-week period at Liverpool.

Chivas USA
Agudelo was traded to Chivas USA on May 17, 2012 in exchange for defender Heath Pearce, allocation money, and future considerations. The latter was reported to be a portion of any transfer fee that Chivas USA receives from selling Agudelo. Following the 2012 Major League Soccer season, Agudelo was invited to train with Scottish club Celtic. Following his training stint with Celtic, Agudelo joined West Ham United for a training stint also. He scored four goals for Chivas in 2012 as they had a poor campaign finishing bottom of the Western Conference. Agudelo began the 2013 well scoring against FC Dallas and Chicago Fire before he was transferred to the New England Revolution on May 7, 2013.

New England Revolution
Agudelo was traded to New England Revolution in exchange for allocation money on May 7, 2013. Agudelo made his New England debut in a 2–0 win over Houston Dynamo and he was credited with their second goal which was originally given as an own goal. He then scored against Toronto FC and the Vancouver Whitecaps before being ruled out for a month with a knee injury. In August 2013 Agudelo began to attract interest from English Premier League side Stoke City. Agudelo returned from injury on August 17, against Chicago Fire and scored a spectacular back-heel goal in a 2–0 victory.

Stoke City
On August 9, 2013 it was announced that Agudelo had signed a pre-contract agreement with English club Stoke City and will join the Potters on January 1, 2014 once his contract with the New England Revolution has expired. However the move fell through after he was denied a work permit. Despite this Stoke completed the signing of Agudelo on January 21, 2014 and loaned him out to Dutch side FC Utrecht for the remainder of the 2013–14 season. He scored his first goal for Utrecht on February 6, 2014 scoring against PEC Zwolle in a 2–1 defeat. Stoke re-applied for a work permit for Agudelo in May 2014 but were again unsuccessful. Following this Stoke mutually terminated his contract leaving him a free agent.

Return to New England
On January 29, 2015 Agudelo re-signed with the New England Revolution after tweeting out "I am extremely happy to officially sign minutes ago and be back with the best teammates and coaching staff #NERevs". On December 3, 2019, Agudelo was selected by Toronto FC in Stage Two of the 2019 MLS Re-Entry Draft, however, they were not able to reach a contract agreement.

Inter Miami
After not reaching an agreement with Toronto FC, who had acquired Agudelo's rights, Agudelo joined expansion side Inter Miami CF. Miami opted to decline his contract option following the 2020 season.

Minnesota United
On March 2, 2021, Agudelo signed as a free agent with Minnesota United on a one-year deal.

Birmingham Legion
On March 31, 2022, Agudelo signed with second-tier side Birmingham Legion who play in the USL Championship.

International career
Agudelo represented the United States at the 2009 FIFA U-17 World Cup. In 2010, he also debuted for the United States Under-20 side. On January 23, 2010, he scored the equalizing goal for the United States Under-20 national team in a 1–1 draw with Brazil.
On November 11, 2010, Agudelo was called up to the United States senior national side for the first time as part of an 18-man roster for a match against South Africa on November 17 in Cape Town. He made his debut for the team coming on against South Africa in the Nelson Mandela Challenge wearing the number 17 shirt. Agudelo scored the only goal of the game on a volley that went in off the underside of the crossbar. In doing so, he became the youngest player in national team history to score in a senior game. On January 22. 2011, Agudelo drew the penalty that led to the U.S. only goal of the match in a 1–1 draw against Chile. In an international friendly on March 26, 2011, he scored the equalizer in a 1–1 draw against Argentina.

Style of play
Most of his key traits involve a precise style of dribbling and ball control. This has often resulted in him being fouled easily and winning free-kicks.

Personal life
On February 6, 2015 his first child was born, a daughter named Catalina Bella Agudelo.

On January 18, 2019 he married his long-time girlfriend, Vanessa Agudelo Gomez. The couple have two daughters: Catalina and Alina from Vanessa's previous relationship. 

Agudelo enjoys playing chess, hiking, and golf. Agudelo remains on a strict eating schedule and workout schedule. Off the field, Agudelo volunteers as a mentor for local non-profit organizations.

Career statistics

Club

International

International goals
Score and result list United States goal tally first.

|-
| 1. || November 17, 2010 || Cape Town Stadium, Cape Town, South Africa ||  || 1–0 || 1–0 || rowspan="3"|Friendly || 
|-
| 2. || March 27, 2011 || New Meadowlands Stadium, East Rutherford, United States ||  || 1–1 || 1–1 || 
|-
| 3. || April 16, 2015 || Alamodome, San Antonio, United States ||  || 2–0 || 2–0 ||
|}

Honors
United States
 CONCACAF Gold Cup Runner-Up: 2011
 CONCACAF Gold Cup Winner: 2017

References

External links
 
 
 Juan Agudelo at Voetbal International 

1992 births
Living people
People from Barnegat Township, New Jersey
People from Kinnelon, New Jersey
People from Manizales
American soccer players
United States men's youth international soccer players
United States men's under-20 international soccer players
United States men's under-23 international soccer players
United States men's international soccer players
Colombian footballers
Soccer players from New Jersey
Association football forwards
New York Red Bulls players
Chivas USA players
New England Revolution players
Stoke City F.C. players
FC Utrecht players
Inter Miami CF players
Minnesota United FC players
Birmingham Legion FC players
Major League Soccer players
Major League Soccer All-Stars
Eredivisie players
Colombian emigrants to the United States
Naturalized citizens of the United States
African-American soccer players
2011 CONCACAF Gold Cup players
2017 CONCACAF Gold Cup players
American expatriate soccer players
Expatriate footballers in the Netherlands
American sportspeople of Colombian descent
American expatriate sportspeople in the Netherlands
Sportspeople from Ocean County, New Jersey
Sportspeople from Morris County, New Jersey
CONCACAF Gold Cup-winning players
St. Benedict's Preparatory School alumni
Homegrown Players (MLS)